Joaquín Tuculet (born 8 August 1989 in La Plata, Argentina) is an Argentine rugby union player who currently plays for the Toronto Arrows of Major League Rugby (MLR). He also played for the national Argentina team The Pumas and the country's Super Rugby team, the Jaguares.  

Tuculet is capable of playing full-back, wing, centre or fly-half.

Professional career
After Pampas XV won the Vodacom Cup, Tuculet was selected for Los Jaguares (Argentina A; not to be confused with the Super Rugby team) for the IRB Nations Cup in Romania and was the teams fullback. Tuculet played for Argentina in the IRB Junior World Championship in 2008 in Wales and 2009 in Japan, featuring for Los Pumitas in matches vs Fiji, Ireland, New Zealand and Uruguay as the teams fullback. He got his first cap for Argentina in 2012, playing against Italian Rugby Union team.

Joaquín was part of the Argentina squad that competes in the Rugby Championship.

He was part of the national teams that competed at the 2015 Rugby World Cup and the 2019 Rugby World Cup. In September 2020, Tuculet retired from Los Pumas one day after bringing an end to his contract with the Unión Argentina de Rugby.  During early October 2020, the Canadian rugby union team Toronto Arrows signed Tuculet making him the third Argentine to form part of the team along with Tommy de la Vega and Manuel Montero.

References

External links 
Fiche et Statistiques du joueur sur Métro-Sports

1989 births
Living people
Argentine rugby union players
Argentina international rugby union players
Sportspeople from La Plata
Sale Sharks players
FC Grenoble players
Pampas XV players
Cardiff Rugby players
Union Bordeaux Bègles players
Jaguares (Super Rugby) players
Rugby union fullbacks
Argentine expatriate rugby union players
Expatriate rugby union players in France
Expatriate rugby union players in England
Expatriate rugby union players in Wales
Argentine expatriate sportspeople in France
Argentine expatriate sportspeople in England
Argentine expatriate sportspeople in Wales
Toronto Arrows players